Hobuck Creek is a stream in the U.S. state of Mississippi. It is a tributary to Doaks Creek.

Hobuck is a name derived from the Choctaw language meaning "eunuch or gelding". A variant name is "Hobuck Bogue".

References

Rivers of Mississippi
Rivers of Madison County, Mississippi
Mississippi placenames of Native American origin